Western Maryland Railway Station, or W. M. Depot or W. M. Railroad Right-of-Way, may refer to:
 Western Maryland Railway Station (Cumberland, Maryland), listed on the NRHP in Maryland
 Western Maryland Railway Station (Hagerstown, Maryland), listed on the NRHP in Maryland
Western Maryland Depot (Parsons, West Virginia), listed on the NRHP in West Virginia
Western Maryland Railroad Right-of-Way, Milepost 126 to Milepost 160, North Branch, MD, Woodmont, MD, and Jerome, WV, listed on the NRHP in Maryland and West Virginia

See also
Western Maryland Railway Steam Locomotive No. 202, Hagerstown, MD, listed on the NRHP in Maryland